Reinsdorf Airfield  is a civilian airfield located in Reinsdorf (Teltow-Fläming),  approximately  south-east of Jüterbog in Brandenburg, Germany.

The airport is mostly used by the civil aviation, including single engine aircraft up to 5 tons, ultralight aircraft, gliders and motorgliders. Over half of the flights are performed by gliders.

In the northern part of the airfield, gliders can perform high altitude winch launches with 2,600  cable, which makes this airfield almost unique in the world (together with the Rothenburg/Görlitz Airfield).

External links
Official website

References

Airports in Brandenburg